Lucas Gabriel Vera (born 18 April 1997) is an Argentine professional footballer who plays as a central midfielder for Russian club Orenburg.

Career
Vera started his career with Lanús. He was moved into the club's first-team in September 2017, with manager Jorge Almirón selecting him to start in a home defeat to Boca Juniors; he was substituted off on fifty-five minutes for Lautaro Acosta. He played a part in three further fixtures in the 2017–18 Argentine Primera División campaign. On 23 August 2018, a month after featuring in the Copa Sudamericana for Lanús versus Atlético Junior, Vera was loaned by Primera B Metropolitana club All Boys.

On 21 July 2022, Vera joined Russian Premier League club Orenburg. Orenburg's director of sports Dmitri Andreyev confirmed that the transfer was permanent, not a loan as it was reported.

Personal life
Vera is the older brother of the footballer Matías Vera.

Career statistics
.

References

1997 births
Sportspeople from Buenos Aires Province
People from Quilmes Partido
Living people
Argentine footballers
Association football midfielders
Club Atlético Lanús footballers
All Boys footballers
Club Atlético Huracán footballers
FC Orenburg players
Argentine Primera División players
Primera B Metropolitana players
Russian Premier League players
Argentine expatriate footballers
Expatriate footballers in Russia
Argentine expatriate sportspeople in Russia